Wahpaton 94B is an Indian reserve of the Wahpeton Dakota Nation in Saskatchewan.

References

Indian reserves in Saskatchewan
Santee Dakota